The Evolution of Melanism: a study of recurring necessity; with special reference to industrial melanism in the Lepidoptera is a 1973 science book by the lepidopterist Bernard Kettlewell.

The book includes Kettlewell's original papers in the journal Heredity on his classic predation experiments on the peppered moth. It also covers Kettlewell's experiments in Shetland on other Lepidoptera (moths and butterflies).

The book is centered on the authors research of evolution of industrial melanism in peppered moths. It does not goes much in-depth about the evolution of melanism in other species as the title might suggest. 
The book introduces the reader with a 50-page long chapter about melanism. Then, the book goes in-depth about industrial melanism. Finally, the peppered moth Biston betularia is discussed in all its known details of that time. Knowledge of the genetics of the melanistic forms of the moths, the knowledge of the predation by birds and the knowledge of blackening of the environment in the English midlands is discussed and used for Kettlewell's most important experiments on natural selection. This is also the climax of the book, namely the details and outcomes of his own experiments on natural selection. Kettlewell also shows other cases, such as his experiments in the Shetland Islands with Lasiocampa quercus (‘Recessive melanic plymorphisms’) and Amanthes glareosa (‘Northern melanism’) (Kettlewell et al., 1969). However, these lack knowledge compared to the Biston experiments. Therefore, they are mostly seem as secondary importance. However, according to Carson (1974), “they play an important role in showing that manifold genetic melanisms can exist apart from those that have evolved as a genetic response to industrial pollution”. The conclusion of the book discusses several melanisms, such as polymorphism.

Importance of the book
The experiments with the peppered moths, as described in this book, are arguably the most dramatic and best known case of adaptive evolution. For many people at that time, this was the first evidence that they could see evolution taking place in the world around them, and could see how fast evolution can go since Darwin came up with the hypothesis (Kettlewell, 1959). In today's biology books on primary schools and even in university books, this is still the one of the most common example of adaptive evolution according to Carson (1974). 
It also led to more studies to industrial melanism in other species and places at that time but also currently. After his papers were published in the late 1950s (from which his book mostly consists of), there was an increase in studies. These included two-spot ladybirds (Adalia bipuncta) in the U.K. (Creed, 1970) and some Lepidoptera from North America (Owen, 1961). More recent studies were conducted on seasnakes (Emydocephalus annulatus) in New Caledonia (Goiran et al., 2017).

Criticism
Most of the information depicted in the book was already published before and it followed the presentation of Kettlewell's papers. He has altered many figures and tables slightly compered to the originals which were mostly published in the journal Heredity. It was therefore criticised that this book was more a compilation of Kettlewell's work instead of a synthesis (Carson, 1974). Furthermore, some of the black-and-white photographs were of better quality in the journals than in the book. 

The entomologist and geneticist Michael Majerus reviewed this in his 1998 book Melanism: Evolution in Action, and compared it with more recent studies which did not support some of Kettlewell's conclusions. He called for more research, and in 2001 began extended experiments.
In 2002, Judith Hooper wrote a book about Kettlewell, Of Moths and Men, accusing Kettlewell of fraudulent data. Majerus concluded his research in 2007, with results which he described as a complete vindication of the natural selection theory of peppered moth evolution, answering the various questions which had been raised.

See also 
 Industrial melanism
Peppered moth evolution
Kettlewell's experiment

References

  The Evolution of Melanism: A study of recurring necessity; with special reference to industrial melanism in the Lepidoptera. Oxford, Clarendon Press, 1973. 
 Book Review: Of Moths and Men: The Untold Story of Science and the Peppered Moth. Scientific American, (1959), 48–53, 200(3). Liebher J https://www.jstor.org/stable/25010462
 Darwin's Missing Evidence. Scientific American, (1959), 48–53, 200(3). Kettlewell H https://www.jstor.org/stable/24944943
Differences in behaviour, dominance and survival within a cline Amathes glareosa Esp. (Lep.) and its melanic F. Edda Staud. in Shetland. Heredity 1969 24:1, (1969), 15–25, 24(1). Kettlewell, H B D; Berry, R J; Cadbury, C J; Phillips, G C DOI: https://doi.org/10.1038/hdy.1969.2
Industrial Melanism in North American Moths. The American Naturalist, 95(883), 1961. Owen D F DOI: https://doi.org/10.1086/282180
Industrial Melanism in the Seasnake Emydocephalus annulatus. Current Biology, (2017), 2510–2513.e2, 27(16). Goiran, C; Bustamante, P; Shine, R  DOI: https://doi.org/10.1016/j.cub.2017.06.073
Industrial Melanism in the Two-Spot Ladybird and Smoke Abatement. Evolution, (1971), 290, 25(2). Creed, E R https://www.jstor.org/stable/2406921
Of moths and men: An evolutionary tale: The untold story of science and the peppered moth. Norton, 2002. Hooper, J 
The Biston Affair: The Evolution of Melanism. Science, (1974), 67, 183(4120). Carson, H L https://www.science.org/doi/abs/10.1126/science.183.4120.67-a

Evolution of Melanism, The
Books about evolution
Evolution of Melanism, The
Clarendon Press books